Alpha Beta Alpha is a national honorary library fraternity that is dedicated to serving college and university library science majors at the undergraduate level. The fraternity has two active chapters, the restored Alpha chapter at Northwestern State University in Natchitoches, Louisiana, and Rho chapter, situated at Kutztown University of Pennsylvania. 37 chapters have been installed.

History
It was the first co-educational undergraduate library science fraternity to be established.

The idea of such an organization was first discussed at a banquet on the campus in 1945 at which were present some forty library science students and librarians with several dignitaries including Nora Buest of the U.S. Office of Education, Sue Hefley, Louisiana State Supervisor of School Libraries, and Mary Harris, Assistant State Librarian. Attendees spoke of the need for a nationwide professional development organization geared towards library science students.

Two years later, on March 15 and March 16, the first Alpha Beta Alpha national convention was held at Northwestern State College of Louisiana.

Charter members
The charter members were: Helen Belisle, Marguerite Bozeman, Mrs. Lucille Carnahan, Agnes Clark, Billie June Corry, Randall Detro, Mary Alice Driscoll, Julia Duke, Patsy Eason, Bobbie Elkins, Ruth Ann Ellender, Yvonne Ewing, Myrtle Freeze, Sue Gilmore, Maurine Gray, May Hammett, Sallie Harper, Katherine Hopkins, Audrey Jo King, Dorothy Keyser, Mrs. Johnnie Mallory, Irene Pope, Olive Roberts, Freida Squyres, Charles Thigpen, Warren Tracy, Tommie Jean Tullos, Dr. Eugene Watson, Mrs. Ora Williams, and Avis Jean Windham.

Symbols
The pledge button is in the shape of a shield and is crossed by a diagonal line. The blazon of the official coat of arms is as follows: 
 Arms: purpure [purple], on a bend argent [silver], three Greek letters , of the first between; in chief, a white rose-leaved vert; and in base, the reproduction of the  key. 
 Crest: on a wreath of the colors, a candle holder argent holding a candle purpure, flamed and resplendent, or [gold]. 
 The motto is Books, People, Service, Life. 
 The fraternity colors are purple and white. 
 The official flower is a white rose. 
 The official seal is round in shape with a reproduction of the badge in the center and with the name of the fraternity and the date encircling the badge.

Chapters
Chapters as of 1968. Active chapters noted in bold, inactive chapters in italics.

Conventions and host chapters
Conventions through 1965 include:
1952 – March 15–16; Alpha Chapter
1954 – March 19–20; Epsilon Chapter
1957 – April 26–27; Gamma Chapter
1959 – April 24–25; Mu Chapter
1961 – April 28–29; Kappa Chapter
1963 – April 26–27; Xi Chapter
1965 – May 7–8; Eta Chapter

Current organization 
On November 20, 1957, the Executive Committee of Alpha Beta Alpha established a new chapter at State Teachers College in Kutztown, Pennsylvania. The Rho chapter is one of two active chapters of Alpha Beta Alpha and is located at Kutztown University of Pennsylvania. The group holds bi-weekly meetings where they plan and organize various service events on and off campus, discuss current events in the library science field, bring in library and academic professionals to talk about library related topics, and job opportunities around the United States. Recently, the organization has offered more social activities and events than just purely academic pursuits. Alpha Beta Alpha on the campus holds an annual banquet where they discuss the year's events as well as honoring special guests and graduating seniors.

In the spring of 2018, the Alpha chapter at Northwestern State University in Natchitoches, Louisiana was restored as an active chapter.

External links
History of Alpha Beta Alpha

References

Library-related organizations
Honor societies
Student organizations established in 1950
1950 establishments in Louisiana